Early myoclonic encephalopathy (EME) is a rare  neonatal-onset epilepsy developmental and epileptic encephalopathy (DEE) with an onset at neonatal period or during the first 3 months of life. It is marked by the presence of myoclonic seizures but multiple seizure types may occur. The electroencephalographic recording is abnormal with eitherusually a suppression-burst pattern or other significantly abnormal patterns. On most occasions the seizures are drug-resistant. After several months, the seizure pattern may develop into infantile spasms syndrome (West syndrome). The neurological exam is abnormal with a significant risk of early death. Various genetic and metabolic disorders are responsible. At present, EME and Ohtahara syndrome are recorded as distinct patterns in the categorization of epilepsies but both neonatal-onset epilepsy syndromes are considered to be merged in one unique entity. It is a severe type of epilepsy syndrome associated with high level of resistance to treatment and a high risk for cognitive impairment. The myoclonic seizures could be seen in other epilepsy syndromes. Multiple types of childhood epilepsies are usually mentioned as myoclonic epilepsies when the myoclonic seizures are a predominant feature.

Signs and symptoms
It is characterized by early-onset myoclonic seizures that can vary from erratic movements of a single limb or a part of the face (focal) to bilateral myoclonic movement of the whole body. The myoclonus may occur at any time (sleep, wakefulneess) from few times per day to very frequent or even continuous myoclonus. The symptoms may start appearing as early as a few hours after birth and up to three months of age. Around three-fourths of affected children present with neonatal seizure. Other seizure types such as focal or generalized tonic seizures, epileptic  spasms or other epileptic manifestations may occur at the course of the disease. The distinctive feature of the phenotype is severe progressive encephalopathy with delay in development and abnormal neurological examination delay (hypotonia, lethargy, poor eye contact, difficulties in feeding) usually being present even before the onset of other symptoms. Head circumference is usually normal at onset but microcephaly may develop over time. Family history is usually normal.

Causes
There are varied etiologies related to EME that are mainly genetic abnormalities (mutations), brain structure abnormalities, or inborn metabolic defects. Another common reason rather than structural brain abnormality is inborn metabolic defects. Sometimes a metabolic disorder that affects how the brain works may lead to EME. While most of these metabolic disorders cannot be reversed, sometimes treating the underlying disorder can help. Vitamin-responsive epileptic encephalopathies are rare but significant reasons.

Genetics
A growing number of genetic aetiologies have been linked to the phenotype of EME and Otahara syndrome and diagnosis by genetic testing can nowadays be achieved in around 50 percent of cases. Some examples of well described genetic aetiologies include: KCNQ2- DEE. • SCN2A-DEE • STXBP1-DEE. • CDKL5-DEE• KCNT1-DEE and UBA5-DEE.

Acquired
No acquired aetiologies are known for EME although etiology remains unknown for a small percentage of patients after genetic, metabolic, and imaging workup. Some acquired conditions may share some features with EME and should be differentiated from it. These include hypoxic-ischaemic encephalopathy, central nervous system infections, acute metabolic disturbances or acute vascular events.

Mechanism
Pathology results in EME consist of multifocal changes in white matter, imperfect lamination of the deep cortical layers, astrocytic proliferation, and demyelination.

Diagnosis
Electroencephalogram (EEG) is usually characterized by a burst suppression pattern. Subsequently it may transition to hypsarrhythmia, a chaotic pattern on EEG, or other severely abnormal EEG patterns. Neuroimaging is useful in assessing a possible underlying structural causality that might cause EME. MRI findings depend on the underlying etiology and may be normal or not at diagnosis.

Prevention
Early identification of metabolism error defects is very essential in prevention as the traditional antiepileptic drug are usually not very effective, proper treatment aiming to the conditions can prevent neurological worsening. Genetic counselling is critical given the high prevalence of genetic mutations and early genetic testing also helps to avoid unnecessary procedures and unsuccessful treatment. The families who are at risk, prophylactic treatment is suggested as it may stop the seizure and help in recovering the neurodevelopmental consequences.

Management
Antiepileptic drugs are used to treat EME, but it is difficult to control seizures with anti-epileptic drugs alone. Phenobarbital, valproate, pyridoxine, zonisamide, and benzodiazepines have all been used but with inadequate usefulness in seizure control. Some patients show favorable response to sodium channel agents, often at high dose. There are various means to add on the treatment when seizures are resistant. A ketogenic diet can be useful in controlling seizures. Surgery is also a treatment option. In epilepsy surgery (focal resection or hemispherectomy) the part of the brain which creates the abnormal electrical current through the brain must be resected, but the surgery is very complicated and needs to be performed by expert surgeons in epilepsy reference centers. None of these treatments, with the exception of some metabolic disorders with specific treatments available, have shown any efficacy at avoid long-term consequences of the disease.

Prognosis
The prognosis is usually poor. Mortality rate is high during early infancy and almost half of the children die by 2 years of age. In the patient with severe phenotype, even when optimal treatment is initiated promptly, the prognosis remains poor. Most of the survivors suffer from psychomotor impairment and develop electroclinical features of other epilepsy syndromes (i.e Lennox- Gastaut syndrome). In patients with reduced phenotype, if there is early treatment initiated the better developmental outcome can be observed.

Epidemiology
The prevalence estimates among EME are of <1 / 1 000 000.

References

External links 

Epilepsy types